The Haseki Sultan Complex (also Hürrem Sultan Complex) is a 16th-century Ottoman imperial mosque complex in the Fatih district of Istanbul, Turkey. It was the first royal project designed by the chief imperial architect Mimar Sinan.

History
The mosque complex was commissioned by Haseki Hürrem Sultan, the wife of the Ottoman Sultan Suleiman the Magnificent. She had married the sultan around 1534 and probably used her dowry to finance the project. The buildings were designed by the architect Mimar Sinan. It was his first imperial project and it is possible that some elements were planned by his predecessor.

The complex contained a Friday mosque, a soup-kitchen (imaret), a madrasa, an elementary school (mektep) and a hospital (darüssifa). The large complex was built in several stages on either side of a narrow street. The mosque was completed in 1538–39 (AH 945), the madrasa was completed a year later in 1539–40 (AH 946) and the soup-kitchen in 1540–41 (AH 947). The hospital was not completed until 1550–51 (AH 957).

Description
The simple mosque is constructed with alternating courses of stone and brick and has a single-galleried minaret. The portico has five arches with five small domes supported by six thin marble columns. Originally the prayer-hall was covered by a single dome with a diameter of 11.3 meters. In 1612–13, during the reign of Ahmed I, the mosque was enlarged to accommodate an increased congregation. A second dome was added and the prayer hall was doubled in size. The painted decorations on the dome are not original. Unlike the madrasa and the soup-kitchen, the mosque lacks any cuerda seca tile-work.

The hospital has an octagonal courtyard and is the only building in the complex with an ashlar construction. The carved stone inscription over the entrance from the street is a chronogram in Turkish giving the date of construction. The madrasa is U-shaped around a central courtyard with 16 small cells and a lecture hall. The soup-kitchen is also arranged around a courtyard. The cooking area at the northern end has four octagonal chimneys.  A surviving account book shows that there were originally tiled lunette panels above six of the windows.

The complex was restored in 2010–2012.

Gallery

See also
List of Friday mosques designed by Mimar Sinan

References

Sources

External links
Haseki Hürrem Sultan Külliyesi, Archnet
Photographs of the mosque by Dick Osseman

Fatih
Mimar Sinan buildings
Ottoman mosques in Istanbul
16th-century mosques
1538 establishments in the Ottoman Empire
Religious buildings and structures completed in 1539